Campagnaro is a surname. Notable people with the surname include:

Hugo Campagnaro (born 1980), Argentine footballer
Michele Campagnaro (born 1993), Italian rugby union player
Simone Campagnaro (born 1986), Italian cyclist
Tiago Campagnaro (born 1983), Brazilian footballer